Alfonso Aguirre Rodríguez, better known as Mithy, is a Spanish former professional League of Legends player, and current assistant coach for 100 Thieves. He joined Ninjas in Pyjamas in October 2013. He joined G2 on May 19, 2016, ahead of the 2016 Summer EU LCS split. He then joined Team SoloMid in 2018. In 2019 he played his final year in Origen before retiring to be a coach.

Tournament results

Origen
 3-4th - 2015 League of Legends World Championship

G2 Esports
 1st — 2016 Summer EU LCS regular season 
 1st — 2016 Summer EU LCS playoffs

References

League of Legends support players
G2 Esports players
Spanish esports players
Origen (esports) players
Ninjas in Pyjamas players
Against All authority players
Lemondogs players
League of Legends coaches